The MF 77 (abbreviated from the French: Metro Fer appel d'offre 1977) is a steel-wheeled variant of the rolling stock used on the Paris Métro. First used in 1978, it now runs on Lines 7, 8, and 13.

In addition, it sports a new, curved silhouette with a wider midsection. Its original exterior colors, blue and white, led passengers to refer to it as le métro blanc, or white metro.

History

Replacing the Sprague
In the early 1970s, upon the completion of the MF 67 delivery, at the time the newest steel-wheeled trains on the Métro, many technological advances in braking and traction  caused the RATP, which oversees operations of the Parisian public transport network, to examine the possibilities for new steel, rather than rubber, wheeled trains to replace the aging Sprague-Thomson fleet. Thus, the RATP commissioned a consortium of companies including Alstom, CEM, Creusot-Loire, and Jeumont Schneider, to design a new addition to the Métro's rolling stock, the MF 77.

The RATP's goal at the time of commission was for 1,000 cars, 600 of which to contain engines for 200 five-car sets. Later, the order was reduced to 187 sets for a total for 935 cars. The first trains were delivered in the summer of 1978 and entered passenger service on 26 September that year on Line 13, whose MF 67 trains were transferred to Line 8. A second order of ten sets was contracted on 4 February 1983, released in 1985 and 1986.

The trains on Line 13 recently underwent their mid-life refurbishment, which included a new interior configuration, updated destination signage, lighting and mechanical improvements. However, the RATP was largely dissatisfied with the refurbishment of the Line 13 trains, citing problems with the contractor that handled the work, as well as defects in the workmanship. Though it is expected that the trains on Line 8 will be refurbished next, followed by the trains on Line 7, the RATP will explore other avenues to carry out the work, even if it means that the refurbishment is done on a lesser scale (similar to that of the refurbishment of the MF 67 on Lines 10 and 12).

As of January 2019, trains on the 7 and 8 are undergoing renovation, but on a lesser scale to that of trains on the 13. While seating on board the trains are extremely similar, noticeable differences between the two projects include:
 Keeping the 2X2 (2 forward-facing seats per side) configuration in the middle of each car, instead of going to the 2X1 (alternating 2 forward-facing seats on one side and 1 forward facing seat on the opposing side) configuration seen on the 13. The ends of each car have been fitted with longitudinal seating as their counterparts on the 13 were.
 Retaining the ceiling lighting panels, grates, and other components as opposed to replacing them completely.
 Retaining elements such as handlebars and static strip maps. Some new handlebars were added to each car however.
 Not installing automated announcements, unlike their counterparts on the 13 that are equipped with such announcements, as well as electronic strip maps.

Additionally, renovated trains on the 7 and 8 will sport the new joint RATP/Île-de-France Mobilités (formerly known as STIF) blue/white livery.

Formations
In date of 25 December 2021:
197 MF77 trainsets were in service and were formed as shown below, with three motored ("M") cars and two non-powered trailer ("T") cars or 3M2T.
72 trainsets on Line 7 based in Choisy (Paris) dépot
 58 trainsets on Line 8 based in Lourmel (Paris) and Créteil dépot
 66 trainsets on Line 13 based in Châtillon and Pleyel (Saint-Denis) dépot
 One trainset was scrapped in 1980.

CH: Choppers (Kesar system)
 CP: Air compressor
SIV: Static inverter
 Car 3 was formerly a 1st class car

Fleet
The number of Mf77 trainsets is 195 :72 for M7 Line, 58 for M8 Line, and 65 for M13 Line

Listing Fleet Mf77 (in french)

Technical specifications
 Train-sets delivered: 197
 Configuration: M+T+M+T+M (Formation I )
 Overall length: 
 Maximum width: 
 Weight:  ( for the motor coaches,  for the trailers)
 Material: Aluminium alloy
 Power: 
 Acceleration:  (in normal load)
 Braking: Electric braking up to  + air-operated brake. 1 disc brake for all the axles + 1 brake with shoe at wheels on the trailers
 Bogies: Cast  solid wheel
 Maximum speed: 
 Authorized speed: 
 Doors: 3 sliding doors per face with manual opening, opening of 
 Air-conditioning: None (forced ventilation)
 Seats: 128 + 118 (folding seats)
 Capacity: 574 people

Gallery

Other networks 
 Lisbon Metro had a forked variant called ML79

References

External links

MF 1977
750 V DC multiple units
Electric multiple units of France
Alstom multiple units